Calliostoma militare, common name Von Ihering's top shell, is a species of sea snail, a marine gastropod mollusk in the family Calliostomatidae.

Description
The size of the shell varies between 15 mm and 47 mm.

Distribution
This species occurs in the Atlantic Ocean off Brazil and Argentina.

References

 Dall, W. H. 1927. Diagnoses of undescribed new species of mollusks in the collection of the United States National Museum. Proceedings of the United States National Museum 70(2668): 1-11.

External links
 To Biodiversity Heritage Library (1 publication)
 

militare
Gastropods described in 1907